The Finger is the fourth studio album by Babyland, released on October 18, 2004 by Dependent and Mattress Recordings. It was their first full-length album in six years.

Track listing

Personnel 
Adapted from The Finger liner notes.

Babyland
 Dan Gatto – lead vocals, keyboards
 Michael Smith – percussion

Production and design
 Babyland – production, recording
 Giuliana Maresca – cover art, photography
 Shawn Porter – recording

Release history

References

External links 
 
 The Finger at Bandcamp
 The Finger at iTunes

2004 albums
Babyland albums